Mark Eshbaugh (born 1974) is an American artist, author, educator, and musician. He has specialized in alternative photography processes and is considered a master in platinum/palladium and chrysotype printing, and excels in gum bichromate, cyanotype and Mordancage processing.

He holds a BFA degree from the University of Massachusetts Lowell, and an MFA degree from the Savannah College of Art and Design.

Eshbaugh has contributed formulas to the chrysotype process that allows for various color and contrast controls. His contributions to the mordancage process include research into how different developing agents and their dilutions will result in different tonalities in the various emulsions of silver gelatin printing papers.

Publications
He has authored a manual on Alternative process photography methods
and monographs including Day's End, Valles Centrales, and Evermore.

His artwork has been included in several textbooks including both editions of The Elements of Photography by Angela Faris-Belt,

Photographic Possibilities, 3rd edition by Robert Hirsch Leanne McPhee, Chrysotype: A Contemporary Guide to Photographic Printing in Gold (Contemporary Practices in Alternative Process Photography) 1st Edition. and Christina Z. Anderson's, The Experimental Darkroom: Contemporary Uses of Traditional Black & White Photographic Materials, 1st Edition.<ref>Christina Z. Anderson's, The Experimental Darkroom: Contemporary Uses of Traditional Black & White Photographic Materials, 1st Edition, Boston: Focal Press/Harcourt. 2022. </ref>

His work has also been featured in magazines and online publications including Black and White Magazine, Hayden’s Ferry Review, and New Landscape Photography.

His creative writing (sometimes in conjunction with art in a comic/graphic novel format) has been published in anthologies, including O Unholy Night in Deathlehem, and The Shadow Over Deathlehem by Grinning Skull Press  and Screams Heard 'Round The World by Hellcat Press

Notable exhibitions and awards

Eshbaugh's artworks were included in the Reus Institut Municipal d’Accio Cultural Biennals Internacionals de Fotografia Medalla Gaudi in 2001 and 2003.Institut Municipal d’Accio Cultural, Biennals Internacionals de Fotografia Medalla Gaudi, Reus (Catalunya) Spain Premis Reus 2001, Pragma, Angencia de Publicitat General, SL p. 6 This bi-annual exhibition features fine art photographers from around the world working in Alternative Photographic Processes (such as Platinum Printing, gum bichromate, Etc.). At each Biennal they award the Medalla Gaudi award to a select few artists and purchase their work for the Institut Municipal d’Accio Cultural's permanent collection.  Mark was awarded the Medalla Gaudi and his work added to the permanent collection in 2003.

Eshbaugh's artwork was included in the 2002-03 traveling exhibition "The American River."  Venues included the Florence Griswold Museum in Old Lyme, Connecticut, The Philadelphia Art Alliance Museum, the T. W. Wood Museum in Montpelier, Vermont and the Brattleboro Museum in Vermont.

His work was also featured in the traveling exhibition for the collection of photographers showcased in Faris-Belt's Elements of Photography book. Venues included Eastern Michigan University, Louisiana Tech University, the John Jellico Gallery at the Art Institute of Colorado, and Fawick Gallery at Baldwin-Wallace College.

As a student for the inaugural workshop in 1996, Eshbaugh was involved with the "Spirit Level" photography workshops founded by Arno Rafael Minkkinen. A few years later Minkkinen, Eshbaugh (then serving as a professor), and Timo Laaksonen added the Tuscany, Italy (2003) and Oaxaca, Mexico (2007) exchange programs to the series.Arno Minkkinen, et al., Spirit Level. Westford, RMR Press, 2008  Works from these later workshops were exhibited in several venues including the Finnish Museum of Photography, and the Whistler House Museum. A book commemorating the first three "Spirit Level" workshops with work by all three professors and each student was published in 2008.

Eshbaugh was named the 2013 Distinguished Alumni from the University of Massachusetts Lowell by the Independent University Alumni Association at Lowell. Eshbaugh's work was also included in the [Photo]gogues: New England (Part 2)'' exhibition, a part of the Flash Forward Festival in 2014. The "[Photo]gogues" exhibition was held in conjunction with the Griffin Museum of Photography and curated by executive director Paula Tognarelli and then Associate curator Frances Jakubek (now Head of Exhibitions at Bruce Silverstein Gallery in New York City).

His work was also featured in the 2015 Danforth Art Museum’s esteemed New England Photo Biennial
 and the 2020 Newport Annual exhibition at the Newport Art Museum.

Some of Eshbaugh's work is also represented in the Photoeye Gallery Photographer's Showcase.

Personal life

Mark lives in Massachusetts with his wife and son. He has taught for a number of Colleges and Universities including Bridgewater State University, University of Massachusetts Lowell, Montserrat College of Art, University of New Hampshire, Plymouth State University, Anna Maria College, and Saint Anselm College. Mark is also a musician who has released a number of albums.

References

External links
 Personal website: http://www.eshbaugh.com/

1974 births
Living people
American contemporary artists
Landscape photographers
21st-century American writers
20th-century American photographers
21st-century American photographers
University of Massachusetts Lowell people
University of Massachusetts Lowell alumni
Savannah College of Art and Design
Savannah College of Art and Design alumni
Anna Maria College faculty
Montserrat College of Art faculty